The Houston–Texas Tech football rivalry is a college football rivalry between the Cougars from Houston and The Red Raiders from Texas Tech. The rivalry dates back to 1951 from the old Southwest Conference.

Series history
Historically, Texas Tech University was one of Houston's original rivals, playing every year from 1976 to 1995 when both schools were part of the now-defunct Southwest Conference. The two teams have had some very close games over their history that came down to the wire, with 16 out of the first 34 matchups being decided by single digits and a tie game in 1987. On September 4, 2021, the two met again to play the Texas Kickoff game at NRG Stadium. After the game, several fans broke out into a fight in the stands.

After having received an invitation in September 2021, Houston announced that they will join the Big 12 Conference on July 1, 2023, which meant that the rivalry would resume as a conference game for the first time since the breakup of the Southwest Conference.

Game results
Rankings are from the AP Poll released prior to the game.

Notes 
A 2021 Texas Kickoff

See also  
 List of NCAA college football rivalry games

References

College football rivalries in the United States
Houston Cougars football
Texas Tech Red Raiders football